Gagik Daghbashyan (born 19 October 1990) is an Armenian football player who plays defender for the Armenia national football team and for Armenian club Alashkert.

Club career
From an early age, Gagik Daghbashyan was fascinated by football. He also had the opportunity to engage in other sports (dance, karate, aikido). His passion for football was stronger and he decided to pursue a football career. At 12 years of age, Daghbashyan began to take his first steps at the football school of Banants Yerevan. In 2007, he was advocated tp Banants-2 and played in the Armenian First League. In the same year, Daghbashyan debuted for Banants in the Armenian Premier League. On 10 November 2007, in the 28 round against Kilikia, he came off the bench at the 75th minute, replacing Yegishe Melikyan.

In January 2015 he joined Slovak Fortuna Liga Club MFK Ružomberok after signing a one and half-year contract.

International career
At the age of 18, he made his debut with the Armenia U-21 team at the 2011 FIFA U-20 World Cup qualifying match that was successfully won, 1-2, on 5 June 2009 against the host Switzerland U-21 team. Daghbashyan would have more field time in the tournament match that took place three days later. He was again entrusted to play at the 2013 FIFA U-20 World Cup qualifying match two years later on 7 June 2011, when the Armenia U-21 team defeated Montenegro, 4-1.

He made his debut in the Armenia national football team on 28 February 2012 in a friendly match in Limassol against Serbia (0:2 defeat).

Honours

Club
Banants Yerevan
Armenian Premier League (1): 2013–14
Armenian Cup (1): 2007

References

External links
Profile at FFA.am

1990 births
Living people
Footballers from Yerevan
Armenian footballers
Association football defenders
Armenia international footballers
FC Urartu players
MFK Ružomberok players
Armenian Premier League players
MFK Dolný Kubín players
FC Alashkert players